Encopella is a genus of flowering plants belonging to the family Plantaginaceae.

Its native range is Cuba.

Species:
 Encopella tenuifolia (Griseb.) Pennell

References

Plantaginaceae
Plantaginaceae genera